Chief Performance Officer of the United States (CPO) is a position in the Office of Management and Budget (within the Executive Office of the President of the United States), first announced on January 7, 2009, by then President-elect Barack Obama. The post concentrates on the federal budget and government reform.

History 
Obama selected Nancy Killefer to be the first CPO/Deputy OMB Director for Management, but before the Senate could vote on her confirmation, she withdrew her nomination, citing a "personal tax issue" as a likely distraction for the Obama administration. Jeffrey Zients was nominated as CPO on April 18, 2009, and confirmed by the Senate on June 19, 2009. He was succeeded by Beth Cobert.

List of officeholders

See also 
 Inspector General
 Ombudsman

References

External links 
 Obama poised to name chief performance officer
 The Rise of the Chief Performance Officer, Harvard Business Review by Tom Davenport

United States Office of Management and Budget
2009 establishments in the United States